Debra Sandlund (Debra Stipe)  (born May 29, 1962, in Geneseo, Illinois) is an American television and film actress. She's a graduate of Northwestern University where she studied both Opera & Theatre. She won the Miss Dream Girl USA 1987 Pageant and had a recurring role as Cindy on Full House opposite Bob Saget. Since marrying Greg Stipe in 1991, she is usually billed as "Debra Stipe."  She and her daughter Sarah run an acting coaching studio in Cumming, Georgia.

Television series appearances:

Film appearances

She was nominated as best actress in the Independent Spirit Awards in 1987.

References

External links 

 
 Debra Sandlund/Debra Stipe Instagram
 Debra Sandlund/Debra Stipe Facebook

1962 births
Living people
American television actresses
American film actresses
Actresses from Evanston, Illinois
21st-century American women